Woo Sun-Hee (hangul: 우선희, hanja: 禹仙姬; born 1 July 1978) is a former South Korean handball player.

In 2003, Woo competed in the World Women's Handball Championship held in Croatia and led her team to the bronze medal. She was finally named to the All-Star team of the competition. At the 2004 Summer Olympics, she won the silver medal with the South Korean team. She played all seven matches and scored 37 goals.

After some years in Europe in the Romanian League, Woo Sun-Hee has returned to Korea where she played handball, until 2017.

References

External links

Sun-Hee Woo Olympic medals and stats

1978 births
Living people
South Korean female handball players
Olympic handball players of South Korea
Handball players at the 2004 Summer Olympics
Handball players at the 2012 Summer Olympics
Handball players at the 2016 Summer Olympics
Olympic silver medalists for South Korea
Olympic medalists in handball
Expatriate handball players
South Korean expatriate sportspeople in Romania
Medalists at the 2004 Summer Olympics
Asian Games medalists in handball
Handball players at the 2002 Asian Games
Handball players at the 2006 Asian Games
Handball players at the 2010 Asian Games
Handball players at the 2014 Asian Games
Medalists at the 2008 Summer Olympics
Asian Games gold medalists for South Korea
Asian Games bronze medalists for South Korea
Olympic bronze medalists for South Korea
Sportspeople from Gyeonggi Province

Medalists at the 2002 Asian Games
Medalists at the 2006 Asian Games
Medalists at the 2010 Asian Games
Medalists at the 2014 Asian Games
21st-century South Korean women